Herbert Lomas (7 February 1924 – 9 September 2011)
was a British poet and translator. He served in the infantry from 1943 to 1946). He then graduated from University of Liverpool, and taught at the University of Helsinki and Borough Road College.
Lomas was a "prolific translator" from Finnish.
In Finland, Lomas was married to Anna-Liisa Partanen (née Aatila) from 28 July 1956 to 29 May 1968. They had no children together but Lomas was stepfather to Anna-Liisa's four children. Later, Lomas married Mary Marshall Phelps on 29 June 1968; they had one son and one daughter.

Awards
 Guinness Poetry Competition
 1982 Cholmondeley Award
 Knight of the Order of the White Rose of Finland

Works

Poetry
 Chimpanzees are blameless creatures, Mandarin Books, 1969
 Who needs Money?, Blond and Briggs, 1972
 Private and confidential, London Magazine Editions, 1974
 Public Footpath, Anvil Press, 1981
 Fire in the garden Oxford University Press, 1984
 Letters in the Dark Oxford University Press, 1986
 Trouble Sinclair-Stevenson, 1992
 Selected Poems Sinclair-Stevenson, 1995, 
 A Useless Passion  London Magazine Editions, 1999
 The Vale of Todmorden Arc Publications, 2003, 
 A Casual Knack of Living – Collected Poems Arc Publications, 2009,

Translations
 Territorial Song, London Magazine Editions, 1981
 Contemporary Finnish Poetry, Bloodaxe Books, 1991, 
 Fugue by Kai Nieminen. Musta Taide, Helsinki, 1992
 Wings of Hope and Daring, 1992
 Wings of the Fingertips are Opening by Leena Krohn. Musta Taide, Helsinki, 1993
 The Black and the Red by Ilpo Tiihonen. Making Waves, 1993
 Narcissus in Winter by Risto Ahti, Making Waves, 1994
 The Year of the Hare by Arto Paasilinna. Peter Owen, 1995
 Two Sequences for Kuhmo by Lauri Otonkoski & Kuhmon Kamarimusikin. Kannatusyhdistys RY, 1994
 Eeva-Liisa Manner: Selected Poems, Making Waves, 1997
 Three Finnish Poets, London Magazine Editions, 1999
 A Tenant Here: Selected Poems of Pentti Holappa. Dedalus Press, 1999
 Gaia, a Musical for Children by Ilpo Tiihonen. Suomen Kansallisteatteri, 2000
Troll: a love story by Johanna Sinisalo. Grove Press, 2004,

References

External links
 "Author's website"

1924 births
2011 deaths
Translators to English
Alumni of the University of Liverpool
Academic staff of the University of Helsinki
British Army personnel of World War II
People from Todmorden
People from Aldeburgh
Place of birth missing
20th-century translators
British male poets
20th-century British poets
20th-century British male writers
British expatriates in Finland